Hermann Wolf (27 December 1919 – 21 October 1996) was a Luftwaffe ace and recipient of the Knight's Cross of the Iron Cross during World War II. The Knight's Cross of the Iron Cross was awarded to recognise extreme battlefield bravery or successful military leadership. During his career he was credited with 57 aerial victories in 586 missions.

Awards
 Eastern Front Medal
 West Wall Medal
 Flugzeugführerabzeichen
 Front Flying Clasp of the Luftwaffe with pennant "500"
 Ehrenpokal der Luftwaffe (20 November 1942)
 Iron Cross (1939)
 2nd Class
 1st Class
 German Cross in Gold (23 July 1943)
 Knight's Cross of the Iron Cross on 24 April 1945 as Oberfeldwebel and pilot in the 9./Jagdgeschwader 11

References

Citations

Bibliography

External links
Aces of the Luftwaffe
TracesOfWar.com

1919 births
1996 deaths
Luftwaffe pilots
Military personnel from Frankfurt
German World War II flying aces
Recipients of the Gold German Cross
Recipients of the Knight's Cross of the Iron Cross
People from Hesse-Nassau